Dominican Convent Primary School (also known as Convent or DC) is a Catholic, independent, preparatory day school for girls in Bulawayo, Zimbabwe. The school was founded in 1895 by the Dominican Sisters, laying its claim to being the oldest school in Bulawayo and in Zimbabwe. Initially co-educational, the institution become a girls' school in the 1950s, when St. Thomas Aquinas Primary School was opened to cater for the boys.

Dominican Convent Primary School is a member of the Association of Trust Schools (ATS) and the headmistress is a member of the Conference of Heads of Independent Schools in Zimbabwe (CHISZ).

Academics
The following subjects are offered at Dominican Convent Primary School: Agriculture, Art, English Language, General Paper, Information and Communication Technology, Mathematics and Ndebele Language.

The Grade Seven pupils sit ZIMSEC examinations in English, General Paper, Mathematics and Ndebele, Agriculture, thus ending their primary education.

Sports
Several sporting disciplines are on offer at the school. These are: athletics, basketball, football, hockey, netball, swimming, and tennis.

Houses
There  are four houses at Dominican Convent Primary School, namely Saint Dominic, Saint Francis, Saint Joan and Saint Theresa.

The following table shows the list of houses and their colours:

Clubs
Pupils take part in the following extra-curricular activities offered by the following clubs:

See also

 Dominican Convent High School, Bulawayo
 List of schools in Zimbabwe

References

External links
  Official website
  on the ATS website

Private schools in Zimbabwe
Catholic schools in Zimbabwe
Dominican schools in Zimbabwe
Girls' schools in Zimbabwe
Day schools in Zimbabwe
Educational institutions established in 1895
Member schools of the Association of Trust Schools
1895 establishments in the British Empire